DWEW-TV was a commercial television station in the Philippines, owned by AMCARA Broadcasting Network. Its studio and transmitter is located at Maharlika Highway, Brgy. Kanlurang Mayo, Lucena, Province of Quezon.

ABS-CBN TV-24 Lucena local programs 
TV Patrol Southern Tagalog

ABS-CBN TV-24 Lucena defunct programs
MAG TV Na, Atin 'To!
Agri Tayo Dito

See also
DZAD-TV
List of ABS-CBN Corporation channels and stations

ABS-CBN stations
Mass media in Lucena, Philippines
Television stations in Quezon
Television channels and stations established in 2005